Henry Watt may refer to:
 Harry Watt (politician) (Henry Anderson Watt, 1863–1929), British politician
 Henry J. Watt (1879–1925), student of Oswald Külpe and part of the Würzburg School

See also
Harry Watt (disambiguation)
Henry Watts (disambiguation)